Michael Hartley Eldon (8 August 1931 - 7 February 2011) was an Anglican bishop in the 20th century.

Born on 8 August 1931 to Sidney and Rowena Eldon, Michael was educated at St Catharine's College, Cambridge; he was ordained in 1955. After curacies in Nassau, he spent nine years on Grand Bahama, becoming  archdeacon of the island. In 1971, he was appointed Suffragan Bishop of New Providence.

In 1971, Eldon became the first Bahamian Bishop of Nassau, resigning 25 years later, after attaining retirement.

Notes

1931 births
Alumni of St Catharine's College, Cambridge
Archdeacons of Grand Bahama
20th-century Anglican bishops in the Caribbean
Anglican bishops of Nassau
2011 deaths
Bahamian bishops